Tolštejn Castle is a ruin of a medieval castle in the municipal area of Jiřetín pod Jedlovou in the Ústí nad Labem Region of the Czech Republic.

History
Existence of the castle is first mentioned in 1337. It was built fr the protection of the road from Bohemia to Lusatia. The Wartenberg family owned the castle until around 1402, when it was acquired by Lords of Dubá. In 1481, the manor with the castle became a property of Schleinitz family from Saxony. After 1587, the castle changed owners a lot. During the Thirty Years' War in 1642 was burned down by Swedish Army and was never restored.

Tourism
Today the ruins of the castle are one of the most visited places in the region. The ruin includes a rocky lookout. A restaurant was built in 1865, which is still in operation.

References

Castles in the Ústí nad Labem Region
Rock formations of the Czech Republic
Lusatian Mountains
Ruined castles in the Czech Republic
Děčín District